Brocket  may refer to:
Baron Brocket, British peerage title
Brocket deer, members of the genus Mazama
Brocket, Alberta, community on the Peigan reserve in Canada
Brocket, North Dakota, city in USA
Edward Brocket, MP
John Brocket (disambiguation), various people
Brocket 99, controversial audio tape and a documentary about this tape
Brocket Hall, palladian country house in Hertfordshire, England

See also
 Brockett